Hal Hale was an American basketball player and coach.

Hale played high school basketball at Jordan High School in Sandy, Utah from 1960 to 1962 and won a state championship there.

Hale played college basketball at Utah State University where he played for coach LaDell Anderson.

After college Hale played professional basketball for the Houston Mavericks of the American Basketball Association before the ABA-NBA merger.  Hale's professional basketball career was cut short when he was drafted into the United States Army and sent to serve in the Vietnam War as a combat medic, winning the Purple Heart and a Bronze Star.

After his Army service Hale returned to Jordan High School and became its head basketball coach, winning a state championship in 1984, as well as two division championships.

References

1945 births
Living people
American men's basketball coaches
American men's basketball players
Basketball coaches from Utah
Basketball players from Utah
High school basketball coaches in Utah
Houston Mavericks draft picks
Houston Mavericks players
People from Sandy, Utah
Point guards
United States Army personnel of the Vietnam War
United States Army soldiers
Utah State Aggies men's basketball players